Hipolito Kanterra Arenas, Sr. (August 13, 1907 – December 28, 1995), nicknamed "Torrento", was a Negro league baseball player. Arenas grew up in Tampa, Florida, but also spent time in Ybor City, Florida. He would climb from local teams to the Negro leagues. Arenas played for the Atlanta Black Crackers from 1928 to 1929, and for the New York Cubans in 1930.

Personal life 
Arenas was born in 1907, in Tampa to Manuel and Facunda Arenas, both of which had immigrated to the United States from Cuba with their, at the time, 3 children. He was the second youngest out of 5 children, having 3 older sisters, Ynes, Theodora, and Juliana, and a younger brother, Cresencio. He worked for the Tampa Gas Company after his career in the Negro league. He married Erma Dancil, and had 5 children; Cecelia, Hipolito Jr., Jorge, Manuel, and Albert. He died December 28th of 1995, and is buried in Tampa's Rest Haven Memorial Park.

In earlier documentation, Arenas's ethnicity was listed as "mulatto", with later references listing him as black.

References

External links
 and Baseball-Reference Black Baseball Stats and  Seamheads

1907 births
1995 deaths
Atlanta Black Crackers players
New York Cubans players
Baseball players from Tampa, Florida
Baseball outfielders
20th-century African-American sportspeople